Liparis angustilabris, commonly known as the twisted sphinx orchid, is a plant in the orchid family and is endemic to northern Queensland. It is an epiphytic or lithophytic orchid with tapered pseudobulbs, each with a single linear leaf and up to thirty five pale green to yellowish flowers that have twisted sepals and petals. This orchid grows on trees and rocks in tropical North Queensland.

Description
Flowering occurs between March and July.

Taxonomy and naming
The twisted sphinx orchid was first formally described in 1864 by Ferdinand von Mueller who gave it the name Sturmia angustilabris and published the description in Fragmenta phytographiae Australiae. The description was based on a collection made by John Dallachy near Rockingham Bay. In 1978, Donald Blaxell changed the name to Liparis angustilabris. The specific epithet (angustilabris) is derived from the Latin word angustus meaning "narrow" and labrum meaning "lip".

Distribution and habitat
Liparis angustilabris grows on trees and rocks in rainforest, especially above  rainforest between the Cedar Bay and Paluma Range National Parks.

References 

angustilabris
Orchids of Queensland
Plants described in 1864
Taxa named by Ferdinand von Mueller